Eucalyptus nitida, commonly known as the Smithton peppermint, is a species of tree or mallee that is endemic to Tasmania. It has varying amounts of loose, fibrous or flaky bark, lance-shaped to curved adult leaves, flower buds in groups of nine to fifteen, white flowers and cup-shaped to hemispherical fruit.

Description
It has smooth cream-coloured to greyish bark but older or larger specimens have rough, fibrous or flaky bark on the trunk and sometimes the larger branches. Flowering occurs from November to January and the flowers are white.

Taxonomy and naming
Eucalyptus nitida was first formally described in 1856 by Joseph Dalton Hooker in his book, The botany of the Antarctic voyage of H.M. discovery ships Erebus and Terror. III. Flora Tasmaniae. The specific epithet (nitida) is from the Latin nitidus meaning "shining", referring to the leaves of this species.

Distribution and habitat
Smithton peppermint is widespread in northern, western and southern Tasmania and also occurs on some Bass Strait Islands. It grows in forest from sea level to hills and plateaus, sometimes as a mallee in coastal sand dunes.

References

Trees of Australia
Flora of Tasmania
nitida
Plants described in 1856
Taxa named by Joseph Dalton Hooker